Estonian Left Party (EVP) was a leftist socialist political party in Estonia.

History
1990: Registration of the independent Estonian Communist Party (EKP).
1992: Congress of EKP renamed Estonian Democratic Labour Party (EDTP).
July 1995: EDLP joined New European Left Forum.
1997: Party renamed the Estonian Social Democratic Labour Party (ESDTP).
2004: ESDTP becomes founding member of European Left party.
December 2004: Estonian Social Democratic Labour Party changes name to Estonian Left Party (EVP).

According to the statutes of party the party congress elects the Party Chairman and Executive board as well as nominates a consultative Central Council representing all regional organizations. Local policies are developed by local organizations, while central bodies formulate national policies.

EVP lost representatives in parliament on the 2003 elections when they got 2,059 votes (0,4%). In 2007 election, it fell further to 0,1% and again got no seats.

The party has been chaired by:
Vaino Väljas (1992–1995)
Hillar Eller (1995–1996)
Tiit Toomsalu (1996–2004)
Sirje Kingsepp (2004–2007)

On 28 June 2008, the Estonian Left Party and the Constitution Party merged to form the Estonian United Left Party.

In a privacy rights legal dispute between Sirje Kingsepp and Eesti Päevaleht, the party was deemed "completely marginal" in Estonia's public life.

References

External links

1990 establishments in Estonia
2008 disestablishments in Estonia
Defunct political parties in Estonia
Defunct socialist parties in Europe
Democratic socialist parties in Europe
Party of the European Left former member parties
Political parties disestablished in 2008
Political parties established in 1990
Pro-independence parties in the Soviet Union
Socialist parties in Estonia
Socialist parties in the Soviet Union